Maphiveni is a village in northeastern eSwatini. It is located north of Simunye, close to the border with Mozambique.

References
Fitzpatrick, M., Blond, B., Pitcher, G., Richmond, S., and Warren, M. (2004). South Africa, Lesotho and Swaziland. Footscray, VIC: Lonely Planet.

Populated places in Eswatini